Trochomorphidae is a family of air-breathing land snails, terrestrial pulmonate gastropod mollusks in the superfamily Gastrodontoidea (according to the taxonomy of the Gastropoda by Bouchet & Rocroi, 2005). Since 2017, its classification has been revised and it now belongs to the superfamily Trochomorphoidea

This family has no subfamilies (according to the taxonomy of the Gastropoda by Bouchet & Rocroi, 2005).

Distribution 
The distribution of Trochomorphidae includes eastern-Palearctic, India, south-eastern Asia, Australian and Polynesia.

Anatomy
In this family, the number of haploid chromosomes lies between 26 and 30 (according to the values in this table).

Genera 
Genera within the family Trochomorphidae include:
 Benthemia Forcart, 1964
 Brazieria Ancey, 1887
 Calostropha Ancey, 1887
 Coxia Ancey, 1887
 Dendrotrochus Pilsbry, 1894
 Entomostoma H. B. Baker, 1941
 Eurybasis Gude, 1913
 Foxidonta Clench, 1950
 Geodiscus Iredale, 1941
 Geotrochus van Hasselt, 1823
 Hogolua Baker, 1941
 Kondoa Baker, 1941
 Liravidena Solem, 1959
 Orpiella L. Pfeiffer & J. E. Gray, 1855
 Peleliua H. B. Baker, 1941
 Probrazieria H. B. Baker, 1941
 Tegumen Gude, 1913
 Theskelomensor Iredale, 1933
 Trochomorpha Albers, 1850 - type genus of the family Trochomorphidae
 Trochositala Schileyko, 2002
 Videna A. Adams 1858
 Videnoida Minato, 1988
 Vitrinoconus C. Semper, 1873

Cladogram 
The following cladogram shows the phylogenic relationships of this family to other families within the limacoid clade:

References

Further reading 
 Baker (1941). Bulletin of the Bishop Museum 116: 273.
 Gude G. K. (1914). [https://archive.org/details/molluscaiitrocho00gude ''Mollusca.−II. (Trochomorphidae--Janellidae)'].The Fauna of British India, Including Ceylon and Burma. London, xii + 520 pp., 164 figs.
 Vagvolvyi J. (1976). "Body size, aerial dispersal and origin of the Pacific land snail fauna". Syst. Zool 24''': 465-488.

External links